Cydia toreuta, the eastern pine seedworm moth, is a moth of the family Tortricidae. It is found in North America.

The wingspan is about 13 mm.

The larvae feed on the seeds of Pinus resinosa and Pinus banksiana.

External links
 Bug Guide

Grapholitini